Sam Craven (born 27 September 1988) is an English former footballer who played as a defender. He played professionally for FC New York of the USL Professional Division.

Career

College and amateur
Craven attended The Becket School in his native Nottingham, and was part of the youth setup at storied English football league club Notts County where he made several first team appearances as a 17-year-old, before moving to the United States in 2007 after being offered a college soccer scholarship at Lynn University. He played three seasons at Lynn, scoring three goals with seven assists in 47 games, was a two-time all-conference selection, and helped the Fighting Knights to two conference titles. He transferred to the University at Buffalo prior to his senior year in 2010.

During his college years he also played with the Long Island Rough Riders in the USL Premier Development League.

Professional
Craven signed his first professional contract in 2011 when he was signed by FC New York of the USL Professional Division. He made his professional debut on 9 April 2011 in New York's first-ever game, a 3–0 loss to Orlando City. 
On 31 January 2012, Craven signed for Conference National club Mansfield Town after a successful trial with the club.

References

External links

1988 births
Living people
English footballers
Buffalo Bulls men's soccer players
Long Island Rough Riders players
F.C. New York players
USL League Two players
Lynn Fighting Knights men's soccer players
Mansfield Town F.C. players
Boston United F.C. players
Hednesford Town F.C. players
Association football defenders
USL Championship players
English expatriate sportspeople in the United States
Expatriate soccer players in the United States
English expatriate footballers